Ask a Woman Who Knows is a 2002 jazz album by vocalist Natalie Cole, with guest Diana Krall, and receiving four Grammy Award nominations.

Background 

Courtesy of the Clayton-Hamilton Orchestra, Cole projects her aura on to songs once recorded previously by great singers like Nina Simone, Sarah Vaughan, Ella Fitzgerald, Dinah Washington, Peggy Lee, Carmen McRae, Barbra Streisand, Diana Ross, Frank Sinatra, and Nat "King" Cole. Natalie Cole's musical choices include songs that depict the various aspects of love—its joy, its sorrow, its loneliness, and its consolation. Included are two of Dinah Washington's gems -- "I Haven't Got Anything Better to Do" and the title track, "Ask a Woman Who Knows"—both songs about love gone wrong. Cole changes the tone of the set with great scatting on the up-tempo swinger "My Baby Just Cares for Me"; big band swing "It's Crazy," the hit by her father, Nat King Cole; and the soulful "I'm Glad There Is You," which features Roy Hargrove on flugelhorn. Natalie Cole sings her engaging musical stories with priceless, nuanced phrasing accompanied by a distinguished core quintet of Joe Sample, Russell Malone, Christian McBride, Lewis Nash, and Rob Mounsey. The added dimension of Natalie Cole performing all background vocals and the backing of the Clayton-Hamilton Orchestra on two songs makes the recording extra special. Overall, this is an exceptional recording that re-teams her with Tommy LiPuma, the producer of her biggest hit, Unforgettable: With Love. "Better Than Anything" is a jazz waltz devoted to "women shopping, guest vocal Diana Krall in perfect agreement that spending money is the best thing in life ("better than honey on bread, better than breakfast in bed" —lyrics by Bill Loughborough), better than anything except being in love. "I'm Glad There Is You," Latin-influenced ballad from 1941 by Jimmy Dorsey. "Calling You" is an Academy Award-nominated song from the Bagdad Café (1987) film. "My Baby Just Cares For Me,"  the only standard here whose title is immediately recognizable, introduced in 1928 by singer Eddie Cantor, best known as the signature tune of singer and pianist Nina Simone.

Commercial performance 
Ask a Woman Who Knows debuted at No. 1 on Billboard's Top Jazz Albums chart an has sold more than 252,000 copies in the United States, according to Nielsen SoundScan.

Track listing

Personnel 
Credits adapted from the liner notes of Ask a Woman Who Knows.

 Natalie Cole – vocals, BGV arrangements (2, 6, 12)
 Joe Sample – acoustic piano (1-4, 7, 8, 11, 13)
 Terry Trotter – acoustic piano (6, 12)
 Rob Mounsey – keyboards (1-4, 6-13), orchestral arrangements (1-3, 6, 7, 11-13)
 Alan Broadbent – orchestral arrangements (4, 9, 10), acoustic piano (9, 10)
 John Pisano – guitars (1, 2, 3, 7, 13)
 Russell Malone – guitars (6, 8-12)
 Christian McBride – bass 
 Lewis Nash – drums (1, 2, 3, 5, 6, 7, 9-12)
 Jeff Hamilton – drums (8, 13)
 Luis Quintero – percussion (2, 9)
 Larry Bunker – percussion (8), vibraphone (8)
 Gary Foster – alto sax solo (6), tenor sax solo (13)
 Roy Hargrove – flugelhorn solo (9)
 Tollak Ollestad – harmonica solo (12)
 John Clayton – orchestral arrangements (8)
 The Clayton–Hamilton Orchestra – orchestra (3, 4, 8, 13)
 The Colettes – backing vocals (2, 6, 12)
 Diana Krall – vocals (10)

Production 

 Natalie Cole – executive producer, liner notes 
 Tommy LiPuma – producer 
 Elliot Scheiner – recording (1, 2, 3, 7, 13)
 Al Schmitt – recording (4, 5, 6, 8-12), orchestra recording, mixing 
 Bill Smith – Pro Tools engineer 
 Joe Brown – second engineer 
 Steve Genewick – second engineer 
 John Hendrickson – second engineer 
 Aya Takemura – second engineer 
 Doug Sax – mastering at The Mastering Lab (Hollywood, California)
 Shari Sutcliffe – production coordinator (Los Angeles, California)
 Jill Dell'Abate – production coordinator (New York)
 Theodora Kuslan – release coordinator 
 Hollis King – art direction
 Isabelle Wong – design 
 Kuaku Alston – photography 
 Dan Cleary – management

Accolades

Grammy Awards

|-
| align="center" rowspan="4"|2003 || Ask A Woman Who Knows || Best Jazz Vocal Album || 
|- 
| "I'm Glad There Is You" || Best Instrumental Arrangement Accompanying Vocals || 
|-
| "Better Than Anything" (with Diana Krall) || Best Pop Collaboration With Vocals || 
|-
| Ask A Woman Who Knows || Best Engineered Album - Non-Classical || 
|-

Charts

Certifications

References

Verve Records albums
Natalie Cole albums
2002 albums
Albums produced by Tommy LiPuma